The 1974 Iowa Hawkeyes football team represented the University of Iowa in the 1974 Big Ten Conference football season. This was Bob Commings' first year as head coach of the Hawkeyes.

Schedule

Roster

Game summaries

at Michigan

UCLA

The victory over the 12th ranked Bruins snapped a 12-game losing streak and was only Iowa's second win in its last 19 games.

Penn State

at USC

Northwestern

at Minnesota

Illinois

at Purdue

Wisconsin

Ohio State

at Michigan State

Team players in the 1975 NFL Draft

References

Iowa
Iowa Hawkeyes football seasons
Iowa Hawkeyes football